Ughi is a surname. Notable people with the surname include:

 Alberto Ughi (born 1951), Italian sprint canoer
 Federico Ughi (born 1972), Italian drummer and composer
 Uto Ughi (born 1944), Italian violinist and conductor
 Giovanni J. Ughi, engineer and scientist
 Chantal Ughi, Italian American kick boxer